is a Japanese footballer currently playing as a forward for Young Elephants FC.

Club career
Yanagizono left Young Elephants FC after his contract expired at the end of the 2022 season.

Career statistics

Club
.

Notes

References

1996 births
Living people
Association football people from Tokyo Metropolis
Tokyo International University alumni
Japanese footballers
Japanese expatriate footballers
Association football forwards
J3 League players
FC Tokyo players
YSCC Yokohama players
Japanese expatriate sportspeople in Germany
Expatriate footballers in Germany
Japanese expatriate sportspeople in Laos
Expatriate footballers in Laos